is a Japanese actor, he is a member of EXILE's theater company (Gekidan EXILE). He is best known for his role as Naoki Irie in the Japanese movie series "Itazura na Kiss".

Sato is represented with LDH.

Early life 
Kanta Sato was born on June 16, 1996, in Tsushima (Fukuoka Prefecture), Japan, where he lived until the age of 7. He has two brothers and used to play baseball from his first year in elementary school to the 3rd year of Junior high school. The Rampage from Exile Tribe's Shogo Iwaya and Hokuto Yoshino were his classmates in high school.

Career 
Sato aimed for the entertainment industry after watching the movie "Extremely Loud & Incredibly Close" when he was in Junior high school.

In 2013, he participated at "EXPG National Academy Audition" in the model department of the Fukuoka branch and passed, which led him to learn dancing. In the same year, he participated in Exile vocal audition "Vocal Battle Audition 4" but failed during the first screening.

In 2014, he participated in "Exile Performer Battle Audition" and made it to the second screening but was defeated by other contestants yet again. In the same year, he became a trainee of Exile's theater company after passing the "Gekidan Exile audition".

In January 2015, Sato officially joined Gekidan Exile and started his activities as an actor. He made his acting debut in the drama High & Low The Story Of  S.W.O.R.D.  

In 2016, he played his first lead role in the movie "Itazura na Kiss The movie in High School".

On 16 June 2021, he released his first personal book titled "Next Break", with one of the 4 photographers involved being his actor friend Takumi Kitamura.

Filmography

Movies

TV Dramas

Web dramas

TV Shows

Stage

Radio drama

Advertisements

Music Videos

Voice acting

Live

Bibliography

Personal Book

Awards

References

External links 

 Gekidan EXILE Official Site
 Kanta Sato Official Weibo @Kantasato
 

1996 births
Living people
People from Fukuoka
21st-century Japanese male actors
Japanese male film actors
Japanese male television actors
LDH (company) artists